
The Avia BH-29 was a trainer aircraft built in Czechoslovakia in 1927, in the hope of marketing it to both the Czechoslovakian Army, and to Czechoslovakian Airlines as a primary trainer. It was an conventional design, an unequal-span biplane of wooden construction and with tailskid undercarriage. The pilot and instructor sat in tandem open cockpits. A more powerful version was built, powered by a  Walter NZ-120 radial engine.

When no interest was shown in the aircraft domestically, Avia undertook a promotional tour where the aircraft was demonstrated in eighteen European countries, but this did not result in any sales either and only a few were built.

Specifications (NZ-85 engine)

References

Further reading
 
 

Single-engined tractor aircraft
Biplanes
1920s Czechoslovakian civil trainer aircraft
1920s Czechoslovakian military trainer aircraft
BH-29